"Beam Beam" (Hangul: 삠삠; RR: Ppimppim, stylized in all caps) is a song recorded by South Korean rapper and record producer Soyeon, released on July 5, 2021, by Cube Entertainment and Republic Records as the lead single of her first extended play, Windy. "Beam Beam" was described as "a hot and strong taste that reminds of summer".

Composition
"Beam Beam" was described as a pop-rock and hip hop genre song that expresses the sun's scorching rays. The song is composed in the key of A♯ minor, 110 beats per minute with a running time of 2:47 minutes.

Commercial performance
The single brought Soyeon her first music program trophy at SBS MTV's The Show on July 13.

Credits and personnel
Credits are adapted from Cube Entertainment and NetEase Music.

 Soyeon – vocals, producing, songwriting, rap arrangement, audio engineer
 Pop Time – producing, audio engineer
 Kako – producing, audio engineer, keyboard
 Kim Dong-min – Guitar
 Bass Cho In-seong – Bass 
 Park Ji-yong – Keyboard
 Jang Woo-young  – Record engineering, digital editor
 Stay Tuned  – Audio mixing
 Kwon Nam-woo  – Audio mastering
 Jang Seung-ho  – Assistant audio mastering

Promotion
On July 5, before the album's release, Soyeon held a showcase event for the media where she talked about the process of making the album. The singer also performed the song for the first time. On the same day, Soyeon appeared on 1theK Originals' The Booth with a live band, and Naver Now #OUTNOW Jeon So-yeon. It is a 3-part comeback project and viewable audio show every Monday at 8 pm KST.

Music video
An accompanying music video for "Beam Beam" was uploaded to (G)I-dle's official YouTube channel on July 5, 2021. It was preceded by two teasers released on the same platform on July 3 and 4.

Accolades

Charts

Release history

References

2021 singles
2021 songs
Cube Entertainment singles
Korean-language songs
Republic Records singles
Songs written by Jeon So-yeon